The 2021 season of the IFSC Climbing World Cup was the 22st season of the competition. Bouldering competitions will be held at six stops of the IFSC Climbing World Cup. The bouldering season began on April 16 at the World Cup in Meiringen, and concluded on 26 June with the World Cup in Innsbruck. The International Federation of Sport Climbing had initially scheduled six bouldering events concluding on 24 October, but COVID-19 travel restrictions resulted in the cancellation of events in Wujiang in China and Seoul in South Korea.

At each stop a qualifying was held on the first day of the competition, and the semi-final and final rounds were conducted on the second day of the competition. At the end of the season an overall ranking will be determined based upon points, which athletes were awarded for finishing in the top 30 of each individual event.

Overview 

* Chief route-setters are in bold.

Overall ranking 

The overall ranking is determined based upon points, which athletes are awarded for finishing in the top 30 of each individual event. There are five competitions in the season, but only the best five attempts are counted. The national ranking is the sum of the points of that country's three best male and female athletes. Results displayed (in brackets) are not counted.

Men 
The results of the twenty most successful athletes of the Bouldering World Cup 2021:

Women 
The results of the twenty most successful athletes of the Bouldering World Cup 2021:

* = Joint place with another athlete

National Teams 
The results of the ten most successful countries of the Bouldering World Cup 2021:

Country names as used by the IFSC

Meiringen, Switzerland (16–17 April)

Men 
101 athletes attended the World Cup in Meiringen.

Women 
70 athletes attended the World Cup in Meiringen.

Salt Lake City I, United States (21–22 May)

Men 
55 athletes attended the first World Cup in Salt Lake City.

Women 
50 athletes attended the first World Cup in Salt Lake City.

Salt Lake City II, United States (28–30 May)

Men 
55 athletes attended the second World Cup in Salt Lake City.

Women 
51 athletes attended the second World Cup in Salt Lake City. Natalia Grossman won the competition, becoming the first athlete to best Janja Garnbret in a bouldering World Cup since Meiringen in April 2018, thus ending Garnbret's streak at nine consecutive wins.

Innsbruck, Austria (23–26 June)

Men 
110 athletes attended the World Cup in Innsbruck. Because of rain delays and restrictions surrounding the COVID-19 pandemic in Austria, the final round was cut short and only three of the four boulders were used.

Women 
89 athletes attended the second World Cup in Innsbruck. Because of rain delays, the finals were cut short and only the first three of the four boulders in that round were counted towards the results. Miho Nonaka was forced to withdraw from the final after a knee injury she picked up on W4 in the semi-final round. 

Coverage of the Austian climber Johanna Färber received criticism from viewers and she described it as "disrespectful and upsetting". The host broadcaster, ORF, issued an apology after the event.

References 

IFSC Climbing World Cup
2021 in sport climbing